Reflections is a compilation of Rick James songs released in 1984. It also contains three until then unreleased tracks: "17", "Oh What a Night (4 Luv)", "You Turn Me On" and also contained a double sided poster. It was released on the Gordy Records imprint of Motown Records.

Track listing

1984 compilation albums
Rick James albums
Albums produced by Rick James
Gordy Records albums